

Champions

Major League Baseball
World Series: Cincinnati Reds over Oakland Athletics (4-0); José Rijo, MVP

American League Championship Series MVP Dave Stewart
National League Championship Series co-MVPs: Rob Dibble and Randy Myers
All-Star Game, July 10 at Wrigley Field: American League, 2–0; Julio Franco, MVP

Other champions
Baseball World Cup: Cuba
Caribbean World Series: Leones del Escogido (Dominican Republic)
College World Series: Georgia
Japan Series: Seibu Lions over Yomiuri Giants (4–0)
Korean Series: LG Twins over Samsung Lions
Big League World Series: Taipei, Taiwan
Junior League World Series: Yabucoa, Puerto Rico
Little League World Series: San-Hua, Tainan County, Taiwan
Senior League World Series: Taipei, Taiwan
Taiwan Series: Wei Chuan Dragons over Mercuries Tigers

Awards and honors
Baseball Hall of Fame
Joe Morgan
Jim Palmer
Most Valuable Player
Rickey Henderson, Oakland Athletics (AL)
Barry Bonds, Pittsburgh Pirates (NL)
Cy Young Award
Bob Welch, Oakland Athletics (AL)
Doug Drabek, Pittsburgh Pirates (NL)
Rookie of the Year
Sandy Alomar Jr., Cleveland Indians (AL)
David Justice, Atlanta Braves (NL)
Manager of the Year Award
Jeff Torborg, Chicago White Sox (AL)
Jim Leyland, Pittsburgh Pirates (NL)
Woman Executive of the Year (major or minor league): Leanne Pagliai, Riverside Red Wave, California League
Gold Glove Award
Mark McGwire (1B) (AL)
Harold Reynolds (2B) (AL)
Kelly Gruber (3B) (AL)
Ozzie Guillén (SS) (AL)
Ellis Burks (OF) (AL)
Ken Griffey Jr. (OF) (AL)
Gary Pettis (OF) (AL)
Sandy Alomar Jr. (C) (AL)
Mike Boddicker (P) (AL)
Andrés Galarraga (1B) (NL)
Ryne Sandberg (2B) (NL)
Tim Wallach (3B) (NL)
Ozzie Smith (SS) (NL)
Barry Bonds (OF) (NL)
Tony Gwynn (OF) (NL)
Andy Van Slyke (OF) (NL)
Benito Santiago (C) (NL)
Greg Maddux (P) (NL)

MLB statistical leaders

Major League Baseball final standings
American League

National League

Managers

American League

National League

Events

January
January 2 – The Chicago Cubs release Vance Law.
January 9: 
Jim Palmer, a three-time American League Cy Young Award winner, and Joe Morgan, a two-time National League MVP, are elected to the Hall of Fame by the Baseball Writers' Association of America in their first year of eligibility.
The Major League Baseball Players Association sends a letter to all clubs advising them that spring camps will not be opened.
January 15 – The Detroit Tigers sign Cecil Fielder as a free agent. Fielder returns to the states after playing the previous season for the Hanshin Tigers of the Japan Central League.
January 19 – After being released by the New York Mets, Gary Carter signs a free agent contract with the San Francisco Giants. 
January 28 – Dan Quisenberry is signed as a free agent by the San Francisco Giants.

February
February 15: 
A thirty-two-day lockout begins as Major League Baseball owners refuse to open spring training camp without reaching a new Basic Agreement with the players. The regular season is delayed one week due to the lockout.
After spending the previous seasons with the California Angels and Kansas City Royals, Bill Buckner returns to the Boston Red Sox as a free agent. A combination of injuries and fans that wouldn't forgive him for his error that ultimately cost the Red Sox the 1986 World Series send Buckner into retirement mid way through the season. 
February 17 – The New York Yankees sign free agent pitcher Mariano Rivera.

March
March 16 – MLB commissioner Fay Vincent announces a new four-year agreement between 1990 and 1993 (CBA-7). The agreement may be reopened by either the players association or teams owners after three years, as well as the minimum salary is raised to $100,000 from $68,000. Besides, the pension/benefit plan contribution by the owners increases to an average of $55 million over the four years while the salary arbitration eligibility stays at three years, but the top 17% of two-year players by service time are also now eligible as free agents. Better known as Super Two, this eligibility represents about 15 players per year.
March 26 – Hoping to duplicate the success the New York Yankees had with Deion Sanders, the New York Mets sign Minnesota Vikings running back D.J. Dozier, who was also looking to become a two sport star. The Dozier experiment fails as he only plays 25 games at the major league level.

April
April 3 – The Chicago White Sox release pitcher Jerry Reuss. Reuss would sign two weeks later with the Houston Astros.
April 9 – Glenn Davis of the Houston Astros reaches base three times after he's hit by a pitch. Davis is plucked by Reds pitchers Randy Myers, Rob Dibble, and Norm Charlton. And interaction with a Houston sports writer after the game Myers replies "We're Nasty Guys", was led to the Reds trio of relievers being called "The Nasty Boys".
April 10 – U.S. President George H. W. Bush throws out the first pitch at a game in Toronto, making him the first U.S. President to toss the first pitch in a foreign country.
April 11 – At Anaheim Stadium, California Angels pitchers Mark Langston (seven innings) and Mike Witt (two innings) combine to no-hit the Seattle Mariners, 1–0, for the first combined no-hitter in the major leagues since 1976. It is Langston's first start for the Angels since signing as a free agent in the off-season. Angels first baseman Wally Joyner makes an error in the fifth inning when he overthrows Langston on Pete O'Brien's grounder. O'Brien tries for second base‚ not realizing that catcher Lance Parrish backs up the play, and he is out.
April 14 – CBS officially assumes the role as Major League Baseball's network broadcast partner (succeeding both ABC and NBC under a four-year deal through the end of the 1993 season) with coverage of the Chicago Cubs at Pittsburgh and Los Angeles at Houston.
 For the first time in MLB history, two Cy Young Award winners contribute to the victory. Bret Saberhagen, gets the win, while the reigning CY Young Award winner, relief pitcher Mark Davis, picks up the save in the Royals win over the Toronto Blue Jays. 
April 20:
Pete Rose pleads guilty to two charges of filing false income tax returns not showing income he receives from selling autographs, memorabilia, and from horse racing winnings.
After retiring the first 26 Oakland Athletics batters, Brian Holman loses a perfect game when Ken Phelps hits a home run in an eventual 6–1 Seattle Mariners win.
April 23 – During an in-season exhibition game against the cross-town rival Chicago Cubs, Steve Lyons of the Chicago White Sox plays all nine positions during the game. However, because it is an exhibition, Lyons is not officially credited with the feat.
April 26 – Nolan Ryan pitches a one-hitter and sets a Texas Rangers record with 16 strikeouts in a 1–0 win over the Chicago White Sox. It is also the 12th career one-hitter for Ryan, which ties him with Major League  Baseball leader Bob Feller, as well as his 200th career game with at least 10 strikeouts. Ron Kittle of the White Sox had the only hit for Chicago, a single.
April 27 – The Milwaukee Brewers release first baseman Terry Francona.
April 29 – Opting to not be placed on the disabled list, Dan Quisenberry announces his retirement. He only appeared in five games for the Giants.
April 30 – In a game between the New York Mets and Atlanta Braves, Braves hitter Mark Lemke hits a ball that is fielded by Mets infielder Gregg Jeffries, who then tosses the ball to Mets pitcher David Cone. Lemke is ruled safe by first base umpire Charlie Williams. Cone mas a meltdown on the field, and begins to argue with Williams, thus allowing two Braves runners to score in the process.

May
May 4 – The Boston Red Sox trade relief pitcher Lee Smith to the St. Louis Cardinals in exchange for outfielder Tom Brunansky.
May 5 – The St. Louis Cardinals sign free agent Terry Francona.
May 11 – The California Angels trade pitcher Mike Witt to the New York Yankees in exchange for outfielder Dave Winfield.
May 22 – Andre Dawson of the Chicago Cubs is intentionally walked by Cincinnati Reds' pitching five times, becoming the first player to do so in Major League Baseball history.
May 26 – The Philadelphia Phillies retire eventual Baseball Hall of Famer Mike Schmidt's number 20.
May 29 – Oakland Athletics outfielder Rickey Henderson steals third base in the sixth inning of a game versus the Toronto Blue Jays. The steal allows Henderson to pass Ty Cobb for most bases stolen in American League history.

June
June 2 – At the Kingdome, Randy Johnson of the Seattle Mariners no-hits the Detroit Tigers 2-0. The no-hitter is the first in both Mariner and Kingdome history.
June 11 – Nolan Ryan pitches the sixth no hitter of his career by defeating the Oakland Athletics in Oakland, 5-0.
June 12 – The Pittsburgh Pirates' Sid Bream and Kansas City Royals' Bill Pecota each went 4-for-4, but neither one scored or drove in a run.
June 14 – It is announced that the National League expands by two teams for the 1993 season.
June 29 – For the first time in major league history, two no-hitters are thrown on the same day in both leagues. Dave Stewart for the Oakland Athletics, no-hits his future team, the Toronto Blue Jays, at SkyDome. Hours later, Dodger pitcher Fernando Valenzuela no-hit the St. Louis Cardinals at Dodger Stadium.

July
July 1 – While no longer recognized as such, the New York Yankees' Andy Hawkins pitches a no-hitter at old Comiskey Park.  However, walks and errors lead to four unearned runs as the Chicago White Sox win 4-0. Hawkins pitches for the visiting team, and pitches only 8 innings since there is no bottom of the 9th.
July 5 – Whitey Herzog quits in his eleventh year as manager of the St. Louis Cardinals. He has a 1,281-1,125 (.532) record in 18 years as a manager, including stints with the Texas Rangers, California Angels and Kansas City Royals..
July 10 – Six American League pitchers combine for a two-hitter and a 2–0 victory over the National League in a rain-delayed All-Star Game at Wrigley Field. Texas Rangers second baseman Julio Franco drives in both runs in the 7th inning and is named MVP.
July 12: 
Barry Bonds hits his 100th career home run.
Mélido Pérez of the Chicago White Sox no-hits the New York Yankees at Yankee Stadium 8-0. However, the game is called after six innings by rain. Perez's no-hitter avenges Andy Hawkins no-no back on July 1; coincidentally, Hawkins is the losing pitcher for New York in Perez's game.
July 17 – The Minnesota Twins turn two triple plays in a single game – the first time that's been accomplished in the major leagues – against the Boston Red Sox, yet still lose the game 1–0 on an unearned run.  The following night, the two clubs tie a major league record by turning a combined ten double plays in their game, another Boston victory.  Boston ties an American League record by grounding into six double plays in the nine-inning game.
July 19 – Pete Rose is sentenced to five months in the medium security Prison Camp at the United States Penitentiary in Marion, Illinois and fined $50,000 following his April 20 guilty plea to two charges of filing false income tax returns not showing income he receives from selling autographs, memorabilia, and from horse racing winnings.
July 28 – The Cleveland Indians retire longtime coach and former player Mel Harder's number 18.
July 31 – Nolan Ryan of the Texas Rangers earns his 300th career win, against the Milwaukee Brewers.

August
August 3 – Against the Philadelphia Phillies at Veterans Stadium, Doug Drabek of the Pittsburgh Pirates has a no-hitter broken up with two out in the ninth. Sil Campusano, who had not even been in the starting lineup, breaks up the bid with a single to right; the hit is the only one Drabek will allow in the Pirates' 11-0 victory.
August 15 – At Veterans Stadium, Terry Mulholland of the Philadelphia Phillies no-hits the San Francisco Giants 6-0.
August 21 – At Dodger Stadium, the Philadelphia Phillies overcome a 10-run deficit to defeat the Los Angeles Dodgers 12-11. After the Dodgers score eight runs in the fifth inning to take an 11-1 lead, the Phillies score twice in the eighth, then five more runs in the ninth before John Kruk ties the game with a three-run home run; a double by Carmelo Martínez scores Rod Booker to complete the comeback.
August 25 – In the fourth inning of a 14-4 victory over the Oakland Athletics at Tiger Stadium, Cecil Fielder of the Detroit Tigers, batting against Dave Stewart, hits a home run that clears the left-field roof. The home run is the third overall, and the first by a Tiger, to clear the left-field roof.
August 27 – At Cleveland Stadium, Boston Red Sox outfielder Ellis Burks hit two home runs in an eight-run 4th inning of a 12–4 victory over the Indians. It is only the second time a Red Sox hitter homers twice in an inning. Bill Regan is the first, on June 16, .
August 31 – Ken Griffey and his son Ken Griffey Jr. start for the Seattle Mariners in a game against the Kansas City Royals. It marks the first time a father and son ever play in the same Major League game.

September
September 2 – After coming close on numerous occasions, Dave Stieb of the Toronto Blue Jays hurls his team's first (and so far only) no-hitter, blanking the Cleveland Indians 3-0 at Cleveland Stadium.
September 3 – Reliever Bobby Thigpen sets a major league season-record with his 47th save of the year in a 4–2 Chicago White Sox victory over the Kansas City Royals. The previous record was set by Dave Righetti of the New York Yankees in the 1986 season.
September 14 – Ken Griffey and Ken Griffey Jr. hit back-to-back home runs in a 7-5 loss to the California Angels. Pitcher Kirk McCaskill gives up the historic home runs.
September 15 – Bobby Thigpen of the Chicago White Sox saves his fiftieth game, becoming the first pitcher to reach that mark.  The White Sox defeat the Boston Red Sox 7-5.
September 19 – At Wrigley Field, Barry Bonds of the Pittsburgh Pirates becomes a first-time member of the 30–30 club. Batting in the fifth inning of the Pirates' 8-7 victory over the Chicago Cubs, Bonds, who had stolen his 49th base earlier in the game, hits his 30th home run off Cub pitcher Bill Long. Bonds will go on to tie his father Bobby for most 30 home run/30 stolen base seasons with five.
September 22 – Andre Dawson of the Chicago Cubs steals his 300th base in an 11–5 loss to the New York Mets, becoming only the second player in major league history with 300 home runs, 300 steals and 2,000 hits; Willie Mays is the first, though they are later joined by Barry Bonds.
September 29 – While waiting through a rain delay, the Cincinnati Reds watch the Los Angeles Dodgers lose to the San Francisco Giants 4-3, which clinches the National League West Division for the Reds.  The Reds are the first National League team to lead their division wire-to-wire since the inception of the 162-game season.
September 30 
Harold Reynolds of the Seattle Mariners grounds out; second baseman Scott Fletcher to first baseman Steve Lyons, giving the Chicago White Sox a 2-1 victory in the final game to ever be played at historic Comiskey Park.  Bobby Thigpen is on the mound to earn his 57th save, establishing a Major League record for saves in a season.
In St. Louis, Pirates pitcher Doug Drabek threw only 80 pitches as he gave up only 3 hits and retiring the final 13 batters as the Pittsburgh Pirates beat the St. Louis Cardinals 2-0 to clinch their first National League East title since their famed 1979 world championship team.

October
October 3: A day for batting champions:
George Brett became the first player to win a batting title in three straight decades. Brett went 1-for-1 in a 5-2 Kansas City loss to Cleveland. Brett also won the AL batting titles in 1976 and 1980.
Willie McGee became the first player to win a batting title in a league he didn't finish. He was in Oakland when he won the title when Dave Magadan of the New York Mets failed to catch him on the season's final day.
October 10 – The Oakland Athletics beat the Boston Red Sox 3–1 in Game 4 of the ALCS to sweep the series and win their 3rd consecutive American League pennant. Dave Stewart is named Series MVP.  Red Sox pitcher Roger Clemens is ejected in the 2nd inning by plate umpire Terry Cooney for arguing balls and strikes, and infielder Marty Barrett is ejected for throwing objects onto the field.
October 12 – The Cincinnati Reds beat the Pittsburgh Pirates 2–1 in Game 6 of the NLCS to win their first National League pennant since 1976. Rob Dibble and Randy Myers are named co-MVPs of the Series.
October 20 – The talk of an Oakland Athletics dynasty is proven premature, as the Cincinnati Reds beat Oakland 2–1 to complete one of the most stunning sweeps in World Series history. Series MVP José Rijo (2–0, 0.59 ERA) retires 20 batters in a row, Randy Myers getting the last two outs to give the Reds their first World Championship since 1976. Not joining the celebration at the end is Eric Davis, who ruptures his kidney diving for a ball during the game and is taken to the hospital. It takes Davis several years to fully recover.

November
November 6 – Atlanta Braves outfielder David Justice was named National League Rookie of the Year.
November 7 – Cleveland Indians catcher Sandy Alomar Jr. was named American League Rookie of the Year.
November 8 – After 8 up and down years with The New York Mets, Darryl Strawberry signs a 5-year contract with The Los Angeles Dodgers.
November 19 – Pittsburgh Pirates outfielder Barry Bonds won his first National League MVP.
November 20 – Oakland Athletics outfielder Rickey Henderson was named American League MVP.
November 23 – Former Boston Red Sox, Philadelphia Phillies and Cincinnati Reds catcher Baudilio (Bo) Díaz is crushed to death when a rooftop satellite dish topples over at his home in Venezuela. He was 37.

December
December 5 – In a blockbuster deal, the Toronto Blue Jays send Tony Fernández and Fred McGriff to the San Diego Padres for Roberto Alomar and Joe Carter.
December 6 – At Herman Darvick Autograph Auctions in New York City, Shoeless Joe Jackson's signature is sold for $23,100, the most money ever paid for a 19th- or 20th-century signature. Jackson, who did not read or write, copied the signature from one written out by his wife. The signature, which is resold within hours, is cut from a legal document.
December 18 – The National League announces the six finalist cities for the two expansion clubs that join the league in 1993: Buffalo, Denver, Miami, Orlando, Tampa-St. Petersburg and Washington, D.C..

Births

January
January 1 – Xavier Avery
January 3 – Hunter Cervenka
January 3 – Alex Meyer
January 3 – Mike Wright
January 4 – Raisel Iglesias
January 5 – C. J. Cron
January 5 – José Iglesias
January 5 – Danny Ortiz
January 11 – Danny Salazar
January 14 – J. R. Graham
January 16 – Warwick Saupold
January 17 – Frank Garcés
January 18 – Anthony Bemboom
January 18 – Brett Lawrie
January 18 – Gift Ngoepe
January 21 – José Ramírez
January 21 – Joe Wieland
January 22 – Jon Berti
January 22 – Mike Hauschild
January 27 – Tim Beckham
January 30 – Eddy Alvarez
January 30 – C. J. Riefenhauser

February
February 1 – Nate Orf
February 1 – Stolmy Pimentel
February 2 – Dan Winkler
February 3 – Jaff Decker
February 8 – Andrew McKirahan
February 9 – Randall Delgado
February 9 – O'Koyea Dickson
February 9 – Henry Rodríguez
February 10 – Tim Hill
February 10 – Allen Webster
February 13 – Nathan Eovaldi
February 13 – Beau Taylor
February 15 – Michael Roth
February 18 – Joe Colón
February 18 – Didi Gregorius
February 21 – Brad Goldberg
February 23 – Jaff Decker
February 24 – Jason Coats
February 24 – Eury De La Rosa
February 25 – Félix Peña
February 27 – Adam Morgan
February 27 – Carlos Triunfel

March
March 1 – Kyle Skipworth 
March 1 – José Valdez
March 2 – Wilking Rodríguez
March 4 – Richard Rodríguez
March 5 – L. J. Hoes
March 11 – Ryan Rua
March 12 – Cole Sulser
March 13 – Scott Oberg
March 15 – Nick Ahmed
March 17 – Andrew Kittredge
March 17 – Jean Segura
March 20 – Brad Hand 
March 22 – Brett Marshall
March 22 – Andrew Susac
March 24 – Starlin Castro
March 25 – Erisbel Arruebarrena
March 26 – Jett Bandy
March 27 – Jake Esch
March 27 – Junior Lake
March 27 – Jake Odorizzi
March 28 – Fernando Cruz

April
April 3 – Destin Hood
April 12 – Edgar Olmos
April 12 – Burch Smith
April 14 – Jacob Barnes
April 16 – Travis Shaw
April 17 – Chris O'Grady
April 18 – Henderson Álvarez
April 18 – Anthony DeSclafani
April 18 – Evan Marshall
April 19 – Jackie Bradley Jr.
April 19 – Brian Flynn
April 20 – Kyle Higashioka
April 21 – Zack Godley
April 22 – Kevin Kiermaier
April 22 – Colton Murray
April 23 – Louis Head
April 26 – Johnny Davis
April 26 – Joey Wendle
April 27 – Aaron Brooks

May
May 1 – Scooter Gennett
May 1 – A. J. Jiménez
May 2 – Erasmo Ramírez
May 6 – José Altuve
May 7 – Keon Broxton
May 8 – Sean Gilmartin
May 9 – Jace Peterson
May 10 – Salvador Pérez
May 13 – Mychal Givens
May 20 – Chris Reed
May 22 – Sam Gaviglio
May 23 – Kyle Barraclough
May 23 – César Hernández
May 24 – Adam Conley
May 24 – Wilmer Font
May 25 – Jarred Cosart
May 25 – Ryan Sherriff
May 26 – Alex Dickerson
May 26 – Paul Sewald
May 28 – Aaron Northcraft
May 28 – Matt Stites
May 29 – Joe Biagini
May 29 – Tyler Pill
May 29 – Trevor Rosenthal
May 30 – John Brebbia
May 30 – Eury Pérez
May 30 – Zack Wheeler

June
June 2 – Jake Smith
June 6 – Tyler Collins
June 6 – Anthony Rendon
June 9 – John Andreoli
June 12 – Jed Bradley
June 13 – James McCann
June 14 – Trent Baker
June 16 – Kelby Tomlinson
June 17 – Matt Barnes
June 17 – Andrew Chafin
June 18 – Lisalverto Bonilla
June 19 – Logan Verrett
June 22 – Darrell Ceciliani
June 26 – Ray Black
June 26 – Drew Gagnon
June 27 – Nick Martini
June 30 – Jesús Aguilar
June 30 – Cody Asche

July
July 1 – Colin Rea
July 2 – Jerad Eickhoff
July 3 – Brandon Maurer
July 4 – Matt Dermody
July 5 – Nick Anderson
July 6 – Preston Tucker
July 10 – John Lamb
July 12 – Chasen Shreve
July 13 – Casey Sadler
July 14 – Jack Leathersich
July 15 – Sherman Johnson
July 15 – Kyle Kubitza
July 15 – Peter O'Brien
July 15 – Mac Williamson
July 17 – Matt Purke
July 19 – Jonathan Pettibone
July 20 – Tyler Webb
July 24 – Sebastián Valle
July 25 – Román Méndez
July 29 – Jacob Wilson

August
August 1 – Aledmys Díaz
August 1 – Kennys Vargas
August 4 – Brian Ellington
August 5 – Nick Martínez
August 7 – Andy Burns
August 7 – Carter Capps
August 7 – José Domínguez
August 7 – Tony Zych
August 8 – Webster Rivas
August 10 – Anthony Gose
August 11 – Mayckol Guaipe
August 12 – Ryan Weber
August 13 – Joe Ortiz
August 13 – Hansel Robles
August 14 – Chris Rowley
August 15 – Adam Cimber
August 16 – Adrián Sánchez
August 17 – Kyle Farmer
August 18 – Yimi García
August 18 – Eric Yardley
August 21 – Christian Vázquez
August 22 – Alan Busenitz
August 22 – Ryan Carpenter
August 22 – Drew Hutchison
August 22 – Chris Stratton
August 23 – Mike Yastrzemski
August 25 – Matt Marksberry
August 25 – Deven Marrero
August 25 – Max Muncy
August 26 – Daniel Corcino
August 27 – Nick Tropeano
August 29 – Chris Taylor

September
September 3 – Shae Simmons
September 4 – Chris Beck
September 6 – Donnie Hart
September 7 – Dusten Knight
September 8 – Gerrit Cole
September 9 – Billy Hamilton
September 11 – Shawn Armstrong
September 13 – Steve Hathaway
September 14 – Cody Anderson
September 14 - David Kandilas
September 14 – Derek Law
September 15 – Parker Markel
September 17 – Brady Rodgers
September 17 – Marcus Semien
September 18 – Juan Minaya
September 20 – Ken Giles
September 24 – Wynton Bernard
September 26 – Brooks Pounders
September 27 – Cameron Perkins
September 28 – Slade Heathcott
September 30 – Jack Mayfield

October
October 6 – Scott Schebler
October 8 – Robbie Erlin
October 9 – Jake Lamb
October 10 – Jonathan Aro
October 10 – Shelby Miller
October 10 – Kolten Wong
October 14 – William Cuevas
October 16 – Kyle Lloyd
October 17 – Rafael Montero
October 19 – Jordan Lyles
October 19 – Tyler Matzek
October 20 – Ty Blach
October 22 – Drew VerHagen
October 27 – Carlos Pérez
October 27 – Jason Wheeler
October 28 – Justin Hancock
October 29 – Ender Inciarte
October 29 – Tyler White
October 30 – Joe Panik
October 30 – Patrick Schuster

November
November 2 – Brian Goodwin
November 2 – Matt Koch
November 2 – Melvin Mercedes
November 3 – Madison Younginer
November 5 – Josh Lucas
November 7 – Danny Santana
November 11 – Vinny Nittoli
November 12 – Hideto Asamura
November 12 – Marcell Ozuna
November 13 – Luke Bard
November 13 – Chris Devenski
November 13 – Arodys Vizcaíno
November 14 – Sam Selman
November 14 – Yasmany Tomás
November 17 – Elías Díaz
November 20 – David Washington
November 23 – Enrique Burgos
November 23 – Jeff Ferrell
November 28 – Roemon Fields

December
December 3 – J. T. Chargois
December 3 – Miguel González
December 3 – Matt Reynolds
December 3 – Mike Tauchman
December 4 – Ángel Nesbitt
December 7 – Steve Baron
December 7 – Brian Johnson
December 7 – Yasiel Puig
December 9 – Bruce Rondón
December 10 – Wil Myers
December 10 – Austin Wynns
December 14 – Mike Ohlman
December 15 – Trevor Hildenberger
December 17 – Taylor Rogers
December 17 – Tyler Rogers
December 18 – Micah Johnson
December 19 – Tim Cooney
December 20 – Bruce Maxwell
December 21 – Mike Clevinger
December 21 – Kendall Graveman
December 23 – Mitch Haniger
December 25 – Garrett Cooper
December 27 – Tyler Duffey
December 27 – Dylan Floro

Deaths

January
January 1 – Carmen Hill, 94, pitcher for three National League teams from 1915 through 1930, who won 22 games in 1927 for the league-champion Pittsburgh Pirates.
January 2 – Bill Beckmann, 82, pitcher who posted a 21-25 record with a 4.79 ERA in 90 games for the Philadelphia Athletics and St. Louis Cardinals from 1939 through 1942.
January 4 – Bobby Balcena, 64, outfielder for the Cincinnati Reds, who during the 1956 season became the first player of Filipino ancestry to appear in a major league game.
January 4 – Bonnie Hollingsworth, 94, pitcher who posted a 4-9 record with a 4.91 ERA in 36 games for the Pittsburgh Pirates, Washington Senators, Brooklyn Robins and Boston Braves from 1922 to 1928.
January 6 – Walter Anderson, 92, relief pitcher for the Philadelphia Athletics during the 1917 and 1919 seasons.
January 7 – Horace Stoneham, 86, owner of the Giants from 1936 to 1976 who moved the team from New York City to San Francisco for the 1958 season; the team won five NL pennants and the 1954 World Series during his tenure.
January 7 – Shag Thompson, 92, backup outfielder who hit .203 in 48 games for the Philadelphia Athletics from 1914 to 1916.
January 9 – Spud Chandler, 82, All-Star pitcher for the New York Yankees who was the AL's MVP in a 20-4 season in 1943; owned career .717 winning percentage.
January 13 – Roy Jarvis, 63, catcher who played in 21 games for the Brooklyn Dodgers and Pittsburgh Pirates between 1944 and 1947.
January 16 – Earl Naylor, 70, backup outfielder for the Philadelphia Phillies (1942–43) and Brooklyn Dodgers (1946).

February
February 3 – Erv Kantlehner, 97, pitcher who posted a 13-29 record with a 2.84 in 87 games for the Pittsburgh Pirates and Philadelphia Phillies from 1914 to 1916.
February 10 – Tony Solaita, 43, first baseman regarded as the only native Samoan ever to play in the majors, who hit .255 with 50 home runs and 203 RBI in 525 games for the Yankees, Royals, Angels and Expos between 1968 and 1979.
February 17 – Larry Cox, 42, backup catcher who hit .221 in 382 games with the Phillies, Mariners, Cubs and Rangers (1973–81); later a minor league manager (1983–87) and bullpen coach for the Cubs (1988 until his death).
February 20 – Cecil Garriott, 73, pinch-hitter for the 1946 Chicago Cubs.
February 24 – Tony Conigliaro, 45, All-Star right fielder for the Boston Red Sox who in 1965, at age 20, became the youngest player ever to win a home run title; hit in the face by a pitch on August 18, 1967, he missed the 1968 season, then made two comebacks from vision problems (1969 and 1975) and hit 62 more home runs during all or parts of four seasons. 
February 27 – Vern Freiburger, 66, first baseman in two games for Cleveland Indians in September 1941 at age 17.

March
March 1 – Creepy Crespi, 72, second baseman for the St. Louis Cardinals during four seasons, including the 1942 World Champion team.
March 6 – Joe Sewell, 91, Hall of Fame shortstop for the Cleveland Indians and New York Yankees who batted .312 lifetime and struck out only 114 times in more than 8,300 plate appearances; led AL in doubles in 1924, and in putouts and assists four times each; brother of Luke Sewell and cousin of Rip Sewell.
March 9 – Lou Vedder, 92, relief pitcher who appeared in one game for the 1920 Detroit Tigers.
March 11 – Roy Schalk, 81, second baseman for the 1932 New York Yankees and 1944–1945 Chicago White Sox; played in minor leagues for all or part of 20 seasons.
March 23 – Margaret Holgerson, 63, All-American Girls Professional Baseball League pitcher who posted a 76-69 record and a 1.94 ERA in seven seasons and hurled a postseason no-hitter.
March 26 – Chet Brewer, 83, All-Star pitcher of the Negro leagues, later a scout for the Pirates.
March 28 – Johnny Neun, 89, first baseman for the Detroit Tigers and Boston Braves from 1925 to 1931, who in 1927 completed the seventh unassisted triple play in major league history; managed New York Yankees in September 1946 and Cincinnati Reds in 1947–1948, then a longtime scout.
March 29 – Phil Masi, 74, a four-time All-Star catcher who played for the Boston Braves, Pittsburgh Pirates and Chicago White Sox between 1939 and 1952.

April
April 8 – Bill Kelly, 91, first baseman who led the International League in RBI three times (1924–26) and in home runs twice (1924, 1926); played briefly for the Philadelphia Athletics and Philadelphia Phillies in the 1920s, and later managed and umpired in the minors.
April 12 – Johnny Reder, 80, Polish sportsman who was a goalkeeper for several American Soccer League teams; played at first base for the 1932 Boston Red Sox, and also was named  the New York–Penn League MVP in 1935 while playing with the Williamsport Grays.
April 18 – John Antonelli, 74, who spent 50 years in baseball, debuting in 1935 as player/manager in minor leagues at age of 19, appearing at third base in 133 games with the Cardinals and Phillies from 1944 to 1945, and later playing, managing, coaching and instructing in the minors through 1985.
April 21 – Johnny Beazley, 71, who went 21–6 with a 2.13 ERA in his 1942 rookie season for the Cardinals and pitched two complete-game wins in the team's World Series over the Yankees.
April 29 – Ray Poat, 72, pitcher who posted a 22-30 record with a 4.55 ERA in 116 games for the Cleveland Indians, New York Giants and Pittsburgh Pirates from 1942 through 1949.

May
May   4 – Jim Schelle, 73, pitcher for the 1939 Philadelphia Athletics.
May 16 – Pretzel Pezzullo, 79, relief pitcher who posted a 3-5 record with a 6.36 ERA and one save in 42 games for the Philadelphia Phillies from 1935 to 1936.
May 23 – Charlie Keller, 73, five-time All-Star left fielder for the New York Yankees who hit 30 home runs three times.
May 24 – José Del Vecchio, 73, Venezuelan sports medicine specialist and youth baseball pioneer in his country.
May 24 – Augie Donatelli, 75, National League umpire from 1950 to 1973 who initiated that league's trend toward a low strike zone, and spearheaded the formation of the first umpires' union.
May 31 – Charlie Shoemaker, 50, backup infielder who hit .258 in 28 games for the Kansas City Athletics between 1961 and 1964.

June
June 8 – Neb Stewart, 72, backup outfielder who hit .129 in 10 games for the 1940 Philadelphia Phillies.
June 12 – Glen Gorbous, 59, Canadian outfielder who hit .238 in 117 games with the Cincinnati Redlegs and Philadelphia Phillies from 1955 to 1957.
June 12 – George McNamara, backup outfielder who hit .273 in three games with the 1922 Washington Senators.
June 12 – Jim Walkup, 94, relief pitcher for the 1927 Detroit Tigers.
June 15 – Bucky Jacobs, 77, relief pitcher who posted a 1-2 record with a 4.91 ERA in 22 games for the Washington Senators between 1937 and 1940.
June 27 – Joe O'Rourke, 85, pinch-hitter for the 1929 Philadelphia Phillies.
June 29 – Boyd Perry, 76, backup infielder who hit .181 in 36 games for the 1941 Detroit Tigers.

July
July 7 – Don Bessent, 59, relief pitcher who posted a 14–7 record with a 4.08 ERA and 12 saves in 108 games for the Brooklyn/Los Angeles Dodgers from 1955 through 1958; member of Brooklyn's 1955 World Series champions.
July 8 – R. R. M. Carpenter Jr., 74, owner or co-owner (1943–1981), club president (1943–1972) and de facto general manager (1948–1953) of the Philadelphia Phillies; 1949 Major League Baseball Executive of the Year.
July 10 – Henry Coppola, 77, middle-relief pitcher who was 3-4 with a 5.65 ERA and one save  for the Washington Senators from 1935 to 1936.
July 24 – Andy Woehr, 94, backup third baseman who hit .274 in 63 games with the Philadelphia Phillies from 1923 to 1924.
July 28 – Red Barrett, 75, All-Star pitcher for three NL teams who set a major league record for the fewest pitches (58) in a nine-inning game in 1944; led NL in wins (23) in 1945, a season split between the Boston Braves and St. Louis Cardinals.

August
August 3 – Bob Brown, 79, pitcher who posted a 16–21 record with a 4.48 ERA in 79 appearances with the Boston Braves/Bees from 1930 to 1936.
August 10 – Cookie Lavagetto, 77, All-Star third baseman who, with the Brooklyn Dodgers, spoiled a Yankee no-hitter with two out in the ninth inning of Game 4 in the 1947 World Series, hitting a game-winning double; last manager of the 1901–1960 Washington Senators and the first skipper of the Twins (1957–1961).
August 11 – Frank Dascoli, 74, National League umpire (1948 to 1961) who worked three World Series, two All-Star games and 2,059 league games; known for his quick thumb, he led NL umpires in ejections in two of his first three seasons, including 23 heave-hos in 1950.
August 12 – Fay Thomas, 86, pitcher for the New York Giants, Cleveland Indians, Brooklyn Dodgers and St. Louis Browns between 1927 and 1935, who also appeared in the 1942 film The Pride of the Yankees as Christy Mathewson.
August 15 – Bob Garbark, 80, backup catcher who hit .248 in 145 games with the Indians, Cubs, Athletics and Red Sox between 1934 and 1945.
August 21 – Bill Lasley, 88, relief pitcher who appeared in two games for the 1924 St. Louis Browns.
August 21 – Bob Uhl, 76, relief pitcher who played for the Chicago White Sox (1938) and Detroit Tigers (1940).
August 24 – Mickey Witek, 74, second baseman who hit .277 with 22 home runs and 196 RBI in 580 games for the New York Giants from 1940 to 1949.
August 28 – Larry Jackson, 59, five-time All-Star pitcher who won 194 games for the St. Louis Cardinals, Chicago Cubs and Philadelphia Phillies between 1955 and 1968; led NL in wins in 1964 with 24 for a Cubs' team that finished eighth in the ten-club circuit.
August 30 – Lou Garland, 85, pitcher who posted a 0-2 record for the 1931 Chicago White Sox.

September
September 1 – Buster Adams, 75, backup outfielder who hit .266 with 50 home runs and 249 RBI in 576 games for the Cardinals and Phillies from 1939 through 1947.
September 2 – Mark Mauldin, 75, backup third baseman who hit .263 with one home run and three RBI in 10 games for the 1934 Chicago White Sox.
September 3 – Marshall Bridges, 59, relief pitcher who posted a 23-15 record with a 3.75 ERA and 25 saves in 206 games with the Cardinals, Reds, Yankees and Senators from 1959 to 1965, who during the 1962 World Series became the first American League pitcher to cough up a grand slam in Series history.
September 6 – Al Veach, 81,  pitcher who posted a 0-2 record for the 1935 Philadelphia Athletics.
September 8 – Joe Gleason, 81, pitcher who posted a 2-2 record in 11 games for the Washington Senators in 1920 and 1922.
September 9 –  Doc Cramer, 85, five-time All-Star center fielder for four AL teams who collected 2,705 hits and was a defensive standout; the only AL player to twice go 6-for-6 in a nine-inning game.
September 12 – Jim Romano, 63, pitcher who appeared in three games for the 1950 Brooklyn Dodgers.
September 20 – Dick Gyselman, 82, backup infielder who hit .225 in 82 games for the Boston Braves from 1933 to 1934.
September 23 – Betty Warfel, 62, pitcher and infielder who played for two All-American Girls Professional Baseball League champion teams spanning 1948–1949.
September 24 – Johnny Werts, 92, pitcher who posted a 15-21 record with a 4.29 ERA in 88 games for the Boston Braves from 1926 through 1929.
September 29 – Al McLean, 78, relief pitcher for the Washington Senators during the 1935 season.
September 30 – Nels Potter, 79, pitcher who posted a 92–97 record with a 3.99 ERA in 349 appearances for the St. Louis Cardinals, Philadelphia Athletics, Boston Red Sox, St. Louis Browns and Boston Braves between 1936 and 1949; his 19 wins led the 1944 Browns to their lone American League pennant.

October
October 1 – June Emerson, 66, Canadian outfielder who played from 1948–1949 in the All-American Girls Professional Baseball League.
October 2 – Heinie Schuble, 83, backup infielder who hit .251 with 11 home runs and 116 RBI in 332 games for the Cardinals and Tigers between 1927 and 1936.
October 4 – Vance Dinges, 75, backup first baseman/outfielder who hit .291 with two home runs and 46 RBI in 159 games for the Philadelphia Phillies from 1945 to 1946.
October 5 – Dixie Howell, 70, utility catcher for the Pittsburgh Pirates, Cincinnati Reds and Brooklyn Dodgers between 1947 and 1956.
October 7 – Walt Ripley, 73, relief pitcher who played briefly for the 1935 Boston Red Sox.
October 10 – George Barnicle, 73, pitcher who posted a 3-3 record with a 6.55 ERA in 20 games with the Boston Bees/Braves from 1939 to 1941.
October 10 –  Wally Moses, 80, right fielder for the Philadelphia Athletics, Chicago White Sox and Boston Red Sox between 1935 and 1951 who hit .300 in his first seven seasons; 1937 All-Star; led AL in doubles and triples once each; later a batting coach for five MLB clubs between 1952 and 1970.
October 13 – Lino Donoso, 68, Cuban pitcher who posted a 4-6 record with a 5.21 ERA in 28 games for the Pittsburgh Pirates from 1955 to 1956.
October 18 – Nick Etten, 77,  All-Star first baseman who hit .277 with 89 home runs and 526 RBI in 937 games with three teams from 1938 to 1946; led American League in home runs (1944) and RBI (1945), and also was a member of the 1943 World Champion New York Yankees.
October 21 – Frank Waddey, 85, outfielder who hit .273 in 14 games with the 1931 St. Louis Browns.
October 24 – Jim Clark, 63, backup infielder who hit .250 in nine games for the 1948 Washington Senators.

November
November 3 – Jack Russell, 85, All-Star relief pitcher who won 85 games for six teams from 1926 to 1940; twice led American League in saves (1933–34), and later became instrumental in raising money to build a baseball stadium, Jack Russell Memorial Stadium, which became the spring training home of the Phillies in 1955.
November 8 –  Earl Torgeson, 66, hot-tempered first baseman who played 1,668 games over 16 MLB seasons (1946–1961) with five clubs; hit .389 in 1948 World Series with Boston Braves, led NL in runs in 1950.
November 10 –  Aurelio Monteagudo, 46, Cuban pitcher with five teams who also gained renown for pitching in the Venezuelan and Mexican leagues.
November 12 – Junior Walsh, 71, middle-relief pitcher who posted a 4–10 record with a 5.88 ERA and two saves for the Pittsburgh Pirates between the 1946 and 1951 seasons.
November 19 – John Fitzpatrick, 86, coach for the 1953–1955 Pirates and 1958–1959 Milwaukee Braves; former minor-league catcher and manager who spent 45 years in baseball.
November 22 –  Joe Bowman, 80, pitcher for the Philadelphia Athletics, New York Giants, Philadelphia Phillies, Pittsburgh Pirates, Boston Red Sox and Cincinnati Reds over 11 seasons between 1932 and 1945.
November 23 –  Baudilio "Bo" Díaz, 37, All-Star catcher, most notably with the Phillies and Reds, who batted .333 in the 1983 World Series.
November 28 – Tommy Hughes, 71, pitcher who posted a 31–56 record with a 3.92 ERA in 144 games with the Phillies (1941–1942 and 1946–1947) and Reds (1948).

December
December 2 – Paddy Smith, 96, backup catcher who played for the 1920 Boston Red Sox.
December 7 – Lew Flick, 75, backup outfielder who hit .175 in 20 games for the Philadelphia Athletics from 1943 to 1944.
December 15 – Bill Otis, 100, backup outfielder who appeared in four games with the 1912 New York Highlanders.
December 16 – Wally Flager, 69, shortstop who hit .241 with two home runs and 21 RBI in 70 games for the Reds and Phillies during the 1945 season.
December 18 – Charlie Gibson, 91, backup catcher who hit .133 in 12 games for the 1924 Philadelphia Athletics.
December 28 – Shirley Crites, 56, AAGPBL infielder for the 1953 pennant-winning Fort Wayne Daisies.

References

External links

Major League Baseball official website 
Minor League Baseball official website 
Baseball Almanac – Major League Baseball Players Who Died in 1990